The Cousins River is a , primarily tidal river in southern Maine. Rising in the town of Freeport at the junction of Harvey Brook and Merrill Brook, it flows south and forms, for most of its course, the boundary between Freeport and Yarmouth.  It flows into the Royal River just west of its mouth in Casco Bay.

The river, Cousins Island and Littlejohn Island are named after Englishman John Cousins (–1682), who emigrated from Marlborough, Wiltshire.

See also
List of rivers of Maine

References

Maine Streamflow Data from the USGS
Maine Watershed Data From Environmental Protection Agency

Rivers of Cumberland County, Maine
Freeport, Maine
Landforms of Yarmouth, Maine
Rivers of Maine